Emitaï (name of a Diola deity) is a 1971 Senegalese drama film directed by Ousmane Sembène. It was entered into the 7th Moscow International Film Festival where it won a Silver Prize.

The film is set in late World War II, with the Vichy government conscripting men from France's colonies. A revolt breaks out in a Diola village where the women hide the rice crop harvest instead of submitting to the French tax. The resistance unfolds in the village simultaneous to the resistance fighting in metropolitan France. When the metropole is liberated, the Diola village sees portraits of Charles de Gaulle replacing posters of Vichy's Marshal Pétain, but circumstances of the village remain unchanged.

Emitai was censored for five years in French-speaking Africa.

Cast
 Robert Fontaine as Commandant
 Michel Remaudeau as Lieutenant
 Pierre Blanchard as Colonel

See also
 Cinema of Senegal
 Senegalese Tirailleurs

References

External links
 

1971 films
1971 drama films
Senegalese drama films
French drama films
Wolof-language films
1970s French-language films
Films directed by Ousmane Sembène
Films set in 1943
Films set in 1944
Anti-war films about World War II
Works about colonialism
Films set on the home front during World War II
1970s French films